Alida Kinnie Starr (born 1970) is a Canadian multidisciplinary recording artist.

Early life
Starr was born and raised in Calgary, where she attended Western Canada High School. Her ancestry is French, German, Irish and indigenous, specifically Mohawk. She is trilingual (English, French and Spanish). Starr has a BA in Race and Gender Studies from Queen's University.

After moving to  Vancouver, Starr formed her first band in 1992. According to legend, the true extent of her talent was first revealed on trip to New York City, when a friend pushed her onstage at an East Village club's open-mic night, where her impromptu spoken-word poetry met an enthusiastic reception.

Career
Following a self-released demo called Learning 2 Cook in 1995, she released her debut album Tidy in 1996, mixing rock, punk, pop, and hip-hop, along with her trademark spoken-word poetry. On that album, she rapped in three languages: English, Spanish, and French.

Starr signed to major label group Island/Def Jam in 1997, following a massive bidding war during which Clive Davis personally flew out to dine the young artist to try and sign her to his roster of pop stars. The next year, Seagram bought Polygram, the parent company of Island Def Jam, and merged it into Universal Music Group. In the resulting upheaval, Starr felt she was lost in the shuffle and she asked to be released from her contract. The material she recorded for her first album with Island Def Jam, 1998's Mending was never released, though some record labels have talked of releasing the lost album.

In 1997, Starr appeared on the Lilith Fair tour. In the late '90s and in 2004, she toured Canada with Veda Hille and Oh Susanna as part of the "Scrappy Bitch Tour".

She performed in November 2000 at Lee's Palace in Toronto.

Cirque du Soleil pursued Starr to sing in their productions, and in 2003 she contracted with them to perform in Zumanity for two years. After releasing her 2003 album Sun Again, she moved to Las Vegas. However, she was back home in Canada by the following year, where she continued to perform and record.

Her 2013 album "Kiss It" was made available to fans at Vancouver’s Queer Arts Festival one week before the official release.

Her 2018 album, Feed the Fire explores finding one's truest self amidst the digital chaos of the 21st century.

Musical style and influences
Her musical style has been described as "hip hop aggro groove".

Starr has enlisted other Canadian musicians to appear on her albums over the years, including Swollen Members' Moka Only, Coco Love Alcorn, former Dream Warrior Spek and Tegan Quin of Tegan and Sara. Nelly Furtado credits Starr as an influence.

Music videos
"Ophelia" Director:  Marsha Herle
"Month of Trickery" Director:  Marsha Herle
"Nearer" Director:  Marsha Herle
"Home is Everywhere" Director: Hannah C
"Go Go See It" Director: Hannah C
"High Heels" Director: Hannah C

Film
Starr's songs have been included on the soundtracks for the TV series The L Word and the movie Thirteen.

In 2001, Starr co-starred in Down and Out with the Dolls, a Kurt Voss movie about a fictional all-girl rock band.

Starr conceived of, and co-produced, the 2016 documentary Play Your Gender, which explores the gender gap in the music industry, asking why only 5% of professional music producers are female.  Produced by Sahar Yousefi and directed by Stephanie Clattenburg, the film premiered at the Canberra International Film Festival in Australia. At the 2017 Melbourne Documentary Film Festival the film was awarded "Best Music / Art Documentary" (in a tie). In 2018, the film was screened at the Reeperbahn Festival as part of the "Key Change Festival Initiative".

Starr composed the score for the 2018 Haida language film Edge of the Knife.

Activism
Much of Starr's work engages positively with female sexuality, in contrast to  male perspectives often associated with hip-hop culture. Starr identifies as bisexual, and has enjoyed popularity in the queer community.

In 2006 she formally became a mentor for aspiring indigenous musicians as a faculty member with the Manitoba Audio Recording Industry Association's Aboriginal Music Program (AMP) Camp.

Starr appeared as a guest on The Rachel Maddow Show on 11 August 2006. On 31 August, her single "Anything" was the first-ever No. 1 single on CBC Radio 3's new countdown show The R3-30.

Starr has often spoken out, for example during a 2013 performance at Vancouver Folk Music Festival, about the importance of protecting water.

Discography

Filmography
2001: Down and Out with the Dolls. Director: Kurt Voss.
2016: Play Your Gender (host, curator & co-producer). Director:  Stephanie Clattenburg. Producer: Sahar Yousefi.

Awards and recognition

In 2004, Starr was nominated for the Juno Award for New Artist of the Year.

Starr was featured in the Royal British Columbia Museum's major 2008 exhibition, "Free Spirit: Stories of You, Me and BC", as one of 150 cultural icons of BC.

She produced the album We Are... by Digging Roots, which won the Juno Award for Aboriginal Recording of the Year at the Juno Awards of 2010.

In 2011, Starr was honoured as a Pioneer in Canadian Hip Hop Culture by the ManifesTO festival.

See also

Canadian hip hop
First Nations music

References

External links

 Official website
 
 Kinnie Starr 
 

1970 births
20th-century Canadian rappers
20th-century Canadian women singers
21st-century Canadian rappers
21st-century Canadian women singers
21st-century women rappers
Bisexual musicians
Bisexual women
Canadian women rappers
Canadian indie rock musicians
Canadian people of Irish descent
Canadian people of Mohawk descent
Canadian singer-songwriters
Canadian spoken word artists
Def Jam Recordings artists
French-language singers of Canada
Island Records artists
LGBT First Nations people
Canadian LGBT singers
LGBT rappers
Living people
MapleMusic Recordings artists
Mercury Records artists
Musicians from British Columbia
Musicians from Calgary
People educated at Western Canada High School
Spanish-language singers of Canada
Canadian people of Indigenous peoples descent
20th-century women rappers
21st-century Canadian LGBT people
20th-century Canadian LGBT people